Niedervellmar is a district of Vellmar, a town in Hesse in Germany.

References

External links 

 Official website

Villages in Hesse
Kassel (district)